Ptereleotris microlepis is a species of the fish family Gobiidae.

It can be found in various parts of Asia and Africa.

Occurrence 
The species can be found near Taiwan, Hong Kong, Philippines, Ryukyu islands, Malaysia, and Indonesia.

It has also been found near Tuamoto islands,  southern parts Great Barrier Reef, Red Sea, and the Indian Ocean.

It occurs in shallow lagoons and harbors. It also inhabits sandy fringes of coral reefs.

Name 
The original name for the species was Eleotris microlepis.

In English the species goes by common names like Blue gudgeon, Green-eye dart-goby, Smallscale hovergoby, or Pale dartfish.

References

microlepis